Faron George Moller (born February 25, 1962 in Trail, British Columbia) is a Canadian-born British computer scientist and expert on theoretical computer science, particularly infinite-state automata theory and temporal logic. His work has focussed on structural decomposition techniques for analysing abstract models of computing systems. He is founding Director of the Swansea Railway Verification Group; Director of Technocamps; and Head of the Institute of Coding in Wales.

Biography
Moller studied mathematics and computer science as an undergraduate at the University of British Columbia, and then as a Masters student at the University of Waterloo, before going on to do a PhD supervised by Robin Milner in the Laboratory for Foundations of Computer Science at the University of Edinburgh.  He has held posts at the universities of Strathclyde and Edinburgh, The Swedish Institute for Computer Science, The Royal Institute of Technology in Stockholm, and Uppsala University before moving to Wales as Professor of Computer Science at Swansea University in 2000.

Appointments and honours 
Moller is a Fellow of the Learned Society of Wales, a Fellow of the British Computer Society and Fellow of the Institute of Mathematics and its Applications, and served as President of the British Colloquium for Theoretical Computer Science for 15 years (2004-2019). He is a Chartered Mathematician, a Chartered Scientist, and a Chartered IT Professional. His full nomenclature with post-nominal letters is Professor Faron Moller BSc, MMath, PhD, CITP, CMath, CSci, FLSW, FBCS, FIMA.

He is also Director of Technocamps, a pan-Wales schools outreach programme aimed at introducing and reinforcing Computer Science and Digital Competency within all Welsh schools and inspiring young people to study computing-based topics; and Head of the Institute of Coding in Wales.

See also
 List of University of Waterloo people

References 
 F Moller, Infinite Results, in U Montanari and V Sassone (eds.), Lecture Notes in Computer Science, Volume 1119, Springer Verlag (1996), pp195–216.
 O Burkart, D Caucal, F Moller and B Steffen, Verification over Infinite States, in J Bergstra, A Ponse and S A Smolka (eds.), Handbook of Process Algebra, Elsevier (2001), pp545–623.
 F Moller, S A Smolka and J Srba, On the Computational Complexity of Bisimulation, Redux, Information and Computation , Volume 194(2), Elsevier (2004), pp129–143.
 F Moller and G Struth, Modelling Computing Systems, Springer-Verlag 2013. .

External links 
 Home page
 
 Swansea Railway Verification Group
 Technocamps
 Institute of Coding in Wales
 British Colloquium for Theoretical Computer Science

1962 births
Living people
Fellows of the Learned Society of Wales
Fellows of the British Computer Society
Fellows of the Institute of Mathematics and its Applications
British computer scientists
Welsh computer scientists
Canadian expatriate academics in the United Kingdom
People from Trail, British Columbia
Alumni of the University of Edinburgh
University of British Columbia alumni
University of Waterloo alumni
Academics of Swansea University
Formal methods people